Daouda Diakité can refer to:

 Daouda Diakité (Burkinabé footballer)
 Daouda Diakité (Malian footballer)